Hans Jørgen Darre (27 September 1803 – 11 March 1874) was a Norwegian clergyman and Bishop of Nidaros.

Darre was born at Klæbu in Søndre Trondhjem, Norway. He was the son of the vicar in Klæbo and constitutional founding father, Jacob Hersleb Darre. He graduated as cand.theol. in 1827 and succeeded his father as vicar in Klæbu in 1833. He was the dean in the district of Dalerne from 1843 to 1848, and in March 1849 he took over as Bishop of the Diocese of Trondhjem (Nidaros). He retired in 1860 with a 1000 speciedaler pension. In 1872, he moved to a town near the Spanish-Portuguese border, where his daughter's husband worked in a mine. Hans Jørgen Darre died in  Miraflores, Spain during 1874, his body brought back to Norway in December 1883.

In Throndhjem, he was a member of the Royal Norwegian Society of Sciences and Letters. He served as praeses of the society from 1851 to 1855 and 1870 to 1872. He was a Knight of the Order of St. Olav.

One of his daughters, Jørgine Wilhelmine, married Lauritz Jenssen, a descendant of Matz Jenssen and Lauritz Dorenfeldt Jenssen. Through her, Hans Jørgen Darre was the grandfather of politicians Hans Jørgen Darre-Jenssen and Worm Hirsch Darre-Jenssen.

References

1803 births
1874 deaths
People from Sør-Trøndelag
19th-century Norwegian Lutheran clergy
Bishops of Nidaros
Norwegian expatriates in Spain
Royal Norwegian Society of Sciences and Letters